Ma Che Kong (also known as Edwin Ma Che Kong; born 25 May 1974) is a retired badminton player from Hong Kong.

Kong won most of the finals he contested in, which includes his victories in Poland, New Zealand, Australia, Chile, Canada, Mexico, Peru, Argentina, and Brazil. In 2000, Hong Kong hosted its first-ever National Badminton Championships and he won the title in men's doubles with partner Yau Kwun Yuen. He was one of the most dominating players of his country in the late '90s. He has represented Hong Kong in major events such as Thomas Cup, Asian Games, World Championships and Commonwealth Games. He was also a team member in Asia Cup badminton 2001. After his sporting career, he started a career as a coach in badminton for disabled people.

Achievements

IBF Grand Prix 
The World Badminton Grand Prix has been sanctioned by the International Badminton Federation since 1983.

Men's doubles

Mixed doubles

IBF International 
Men's doubles

Mixed doubles

References 

Hong Kong male badminton players
1974 births
Living people
Badminton players at the 1994 Commonwealth Games
Commonwealth Games bronze medallists for Hong Kong
Commonwealth Games medallists in badminton
Badminton players at the 1998 Asian Games
Asian Games competitors for Hong Kong
Medallists at the 1994 Commonwealth Games